Gerry O'Connor may refer to:
 Gerry O'Connor (fiddle player), Irish fiddle player
 Gerry O'Connor (banjo player), tenor banjo player
 Gerry O'Connor (hurling manager) (born 1966), Irish hurling manager and former player

See also
Jerry O'Connor (born 1979), Irish hurler
Jerry L. O'Connor (born 1953), Wisconsin state legislator
Jeremy O'Connor (sailor) (born 1955), Zimbabwean Olympic sailor
Gerry Connor (1932–1993), cricketer
Gerald O'Connor (1890–1949), Alberta politician
Jerome Murphy-O'Connor, priest and theologian